The Korea Greens was a political group in South Korea. It was established on June 10, 2004, following initial discussions in 2003. They were a member of the Global Greens and the Asia-Pacific Green Network. It was dissolved on July 12, 2008.

See also
 Green Party Korea

External links
Official site

Green political parties
Political parties established in 2004
Defunct political parties in South Korea
Global Greens member parties
Progressive parties in South Korea